Aitor Etxeberría de la Rosa (born 21 February 1976 in Gorliz) is a Spanish rugby union player. He plays as a fly-half. He is left-footed and he usually filled in regularly for the injury-prone Kovalenco.

Career
His first international match was against Andorra, at Andorra la Vella, on 8 November 1997. He was part of the 1999 Rugby World Cup roster, playing the match against South Africa.

External links

1976 births
Living people
Rugby union players from the Basque Country (autonomous community)
Spanish rugby union players
Rugby union fly-halves
Spain international rugby union players
People from Mungialdea
Sportspeople from Biscay